The 2016 Toledo Rockets football team represented the University of Toledo in the 2016 NCAA Division I FBS football season. They were led by head coach Jason Candle in his first full overall year, after coaching the 2015 Boca Raton Bowl. They played their home games at the Glass Bowl and were members of the West Division of the Mid-American Conference. They finished the season 9–4, 6–2 in MAC play to finish in second place in the West Division. They were invited to the Camellia Bowl where they lost to Appalachian State.

Schedule

Schedule Source

Game summaries

at Arkansas State

Maine

Fresno State

at BYU

at Eastern Michigan

Bowling Green

Central Michigan

Ohio

at Akron

vs Northern Illinois

Ball State

at Western Michigan

Appalachian State–Camellia Bowl

References

Toledo
Toledo Rockets football seasons
Toledo Rockets football